Martin Brockman (born 13 November 1987) is a British former decathlete.

A native of Maidstone, Kent, Brockman was a junior high jumper before converting to decathlon. He secured a bronze medal in decathlon at the 2010 Commonwealth Games in Delhi, with his win in the 1,500 metre race enough to edge teammate Ben Hazell for the last podium place. After failing to make the 2012 Olympic team, Brockman competed at the 2014 Commonwealth Games in Glasgow, where he came 13th in the decathlon.

References

External links
Martin Brockman at World Athletics

1987 births
Living people
British decathletes
English decathletes
Sportspeople from Maidstone
Athletes (track and field) at the 2010 Commonwealth Games
Medallists at the 2010 Commonwealth Games
Commonwealth Games bronze medallists for England
Commonwealth Games medallists in athletics
Athletes (track and field) at the 2014 Commonwealth Games